PROTA can refer to:
 Plant Resources of Tropical Africa
 Project for the Translation of Arabic
 prota, Protopope